Lee J. Baggett Jr. (January 11, 1927 – August 10, 1999) was a four star admiral in the United States Navy who served as Commander in Chief Europe in 1985 and Commander in Chief of the United States Atlantic Command from 1985 to 1988.

A native of Oxford, Mississippi, Baggett studied civil engineering at the University of Mississippi for two years before entering the United States Naval Academy. He was commissioned in 1950 after earning his B.S. degree. Baggett later received an M.S. degree in nuclear physics from the Naval Postgraduate School. His May 1958 thesis entitled π−-p Elastic Scattering and Single Pion Production at 0.939 Bev/c was based on research conducted at the Radiation Laboratory of the University of California, Berkeley. Baggett also studied at the Naval War College.

A career surface warfare officer, Baggett commanded two minesweepers and two guided missile destroyers. As a vice admiral, he served as commander, Naval Surface Force Pacific from May 1979 to July 1982.

Baggett died in 1999 of heart disease. He was interred at Fort Rosecrans National Cemetery.

Awards and decorations

References

1927 births
1999 deaths
People from Oxford, Mississippi
University of Mississippi alumni
United States Naval Academy alumni
United States Navy personnel of the Korean War
University of California, Berkeley alumni
Naval Postgraduate School alumni
Naval War College alumni
United States Navy personnel of the Vietnam War
Recipients of the Distinguished Service Order (Vietnam)
Recipients of the Meritorious Service Medal (United States)
Recipients of the Legion of Merit
United States Navy admirals
Recipients of the Navy Distinguished Service Medal
Recipients of the Defense Distinguished Service Medal
Burials at Fort Rosecrans National Cemetery